John Bouchier  may refer to:

John Bourchier, 1st Baron Berners (d. 1474)
John Bourchier, 2nd Baron Berners (1467 – 1533), English soldier, statesman and translator
John de Bourchier (d.circa 1330), English Judge

See also
John Boucher (disambiguation)
 John Bouchier-Hayes (born 1944), Irish fencer